The 2012 Fed Cup (also known as the 2012 Fed Cup by BNP Paribas for sponsorship purposes) was the 50th edition of the most important tournament between national teams in women's tennis. The draw took place on 17 July 2011 in Kobe, Japan.

The final took place at the O2 Arena in Prague, Czech Republic on 3–4 November. The home and defending champions Czech Republic defeated the first-finalists Serbia, to win their seventh title and equal the record for second-most titles won by a country since the competition's beginning.

Czech Republic was the only country except United States and Australia to hold both Davis Cup and Fed Cup at the same time. The Czechs did the same in 2012. Petra Kvitová and Tomáš Berdych also scored Hopman Cup victory at the same year.

World Group

Draw

World Group play-offs

The four losing teams in the World Group first round ties, and four winners of the World Group II ties entered the draw for the World Group play-offs. Four seeded teams, based on the latest Fed Cup ranking, were drawn against four unseeded teams. The United States, Japan, Slovakia and Australia played in the 2013 Fed Cup World Group while Ukraine, Belgium, Spain and Germany played in World Group II.

Date: 21–22 April

World Group II

The World Group II was the second highest level of Fed Cup competition in 2012. The winners advanced to the World Group play-offs, while the losers continued in the World Group II play-offs.

Date: 4–5 February

World Group II play-offs

The four losing teams from World Group II played off against qualifiers from Zonal Group I. Two teams qualified from Europe/Africa Zone, one team from the Asia/Oceania Zone, and one team from the Americas Zone.

Date: 21–22 April

Americas Zone 

 Nations in bold advanced to the higher level of competition.
 Nations in italics were relegated down to a lower level of competition.

Group I 
Venue: Graciosa Country Club, Curitiba, Brazil (outdoor clay)

Dates: January 30 – February 5

Participating Teams

Group II 
Venue: Guadalajara, Mexico

Dates: Week commencing 16 April

Participating Teams

Asia/Oceania Zone 

 Nations in bold advanced to the higher level of competition.
 Nations in italics were relegated down to a lower level of competition.

Group I 
Venue: Shenzhen Luohu Tennis Centre, Shenzhen, China (outdoor hard)

Dates: January 30 – February 5

Participating Teams

Group II 
Venue: Shenzhen Luohu Tennis Centre, Shenzhen, China (outdoor hard)

Dates: January 30 – February 5

Participating Teams

Europe/Africa Zone 

 Nations in bold advanced to the higher level of competition.
 Nations in italics were relegated down to a lower level of competition.

Group I 
Venue: Municipal Tennis Club, Eilat, Israel (outdoor hard)

Dates: January 30 – February 5

Participating Teams

Group II 
Venue: Gizera Sporting Club, Cairo, Egypt

Dates: Week commencing 16 April

Participating Teams

Group III 
Venue: Gizera Sporting Club, Cairo, Egypt

Dates: Week commencing 16 April

Participating Teams

Rankings
The rankings were measured after the three points during the year that play took place, and were collated by combining points earned from the previous four years.

References

External links 
 2012 Fed Cup

 
Fed Cup
Billie Jean King Cups by year
2012 in women's tennis